Fladen Ground is an area in the Scottish sector of the North Sea, between Scotland and Norway, about  northeast of Aberdeen. The Fair Isle current and adjacent East Shetland Atlantic tides contribute to a weak, anti-clockwise rotating vast vortex or eddy easily shown in the surface of the seabed. Due to stratification of the water column in the summer months, seasonal change of deep water temperature is low. This measures. The dominant benthic animals are polychaetes and shellfish and other seafoods are common. The name is not used by the British shipping (weather) forecast sectors, which extend the Long Forties depth zone eastward as Forties (see Long Forties) for simplicity.

Fladen Ground is rich in oil and natural gas and offers good fishing. Scottish vessels catch low-fat fish species, and Norway lobster. Danish and English vessels catch Northern prawn.

Nature Conservation Marine Protected Area

Since 2014,  of the Fladen Ground has been a Nature Conservation Marine Protected Area under the title Central Fladen MPA(NC).

See also
 Dogger Bank for links to similar places

Notes

References
 

North Sea
Nature Conservation Marine Protected Areas of Scotland